Mount Samsari is a peak of the Abul-Samsari Range in Southern Georgia. The formation of the caldera is linked to local fault systems. The floor of the caldera is lined with rocks and glacial debris as well as small lakes and contains volcanokarst formations. The caldera rim contains traces of previous glaciation, including cirques. The mountain was built up during the late Quaternary period and is made up of andesites, dacites and rhyolites. The slopes of Samsari are mainly devoid of vegetation. The caldera formed roughly 200ka ago.

References

 Georgian State (Soviet) Encyclopedia. 1985. Book 9. p. 33.
 The Structural Position and Conditions of Formation of the Samsari Caldera Volcano (Javakheti Upland, Georgia), Bezhan Tutberidze, Mariam Akhalkatsishvili, Hamlet Salukvadze.
 The Samsari Volcanic Center as an Example of Recent Volcanism in the Lesser Caucasus: K–Ar Geochronological and Sr–Nd Isotopic Data DOKLADY EARTH SCIENCES Vol. 393A No. 9 2003

Samsari, Mount
Samsari, Mount
Mountains of Samtskhe-Javakheti region
Samsari, Mount
Samsari, Mount